The ITT Wars: An Insider's View of Hostile Takeovers is a non-fiction book about ITT Corporation written by its CEO Rand Araskog. The book was published by Henry Holt & Co. in 1989.

Contents
The book chronicles a hostile takeover attempt by Jay Pritzker to get control over the corporation.

Review

—Review by Chicago Tribune

See also
 Holding company
 List of conglomerates
 Media conglomerate

References

External links
Google books

1989 non-fiction books
Books about companies
Books about multinational companies
Business books
ITT Inc.
Pritzker family
Henry Holt and Company books